The News-Dispatch is the daily newspaper of Michigan City, Indiana.

References

External links
 Official website

Newspapers published in Indiana
Michigan City, Indiana